Pukaki Airport  is a small airport in the Mackenzie District of the South Island of New Zealand. The airport is located about 3 km North from the township of Twizel and is 284 km from Christchurch.

The airport contains a fully automated Met Service weather station, thirteen hangars, and a fuel supplies.

Resident operators offer charter and scenic flights from the aerodrome.

A record low temperature was set at Pukaki Airport of -19.8 °C on the morning of 23 June 2015.

The airport was also one of the filming locations of the 2009 zombie movie Last of the Living.

See also

 List of airports in New Zealand
 List of airlines of New Zealand
 Transport in New Zealand

References

AIP New Zealand (PDF)

External links
 Official Airport Site

Airports in New Zealand
Transport buildings and structures in Canterbury, New Zealand